The Murrumburrah Signal and County of Harden Advocate, also known as the Murrumburrah Signal, and The Signal, Murrumburrah-Harden, was an English language newspaper published from 1881 to 1947 in Murrumburrah, New South Wales, Australia.

History 
The Murrumburrah Signal and County of Harden Advocate was first published on 6 August 1881 by proprietors P. Jefferson Wallace and Robert Bruce Wallace. Initially it was published every Saturday and circulated in Murrumburrah and the surrounding districts. From 14 November 1946 the title changed to The Signal, Murrumburrah-Harden. The paper ceased publication on 9 January 1947 when it was merged with the Harden Express to form The Harden-Murrumburrah Express.

Digitisation 
The Murrumburrah Signal and County of Harden Advocate has been digitised as part of the Australian Newspapers Digitisation Program of the National Library of Australia.

See also 
 List of newspapers in New South Wales
 List of newspapers in Australia

References

External links 
 

Defunct newspapers published in New South Wales
Newspapers on Trove